Holness is an English surname. Notable people with the surname include:

 Adele Holness, English electronic musician
 Andrew Holness (born 1972), Jamaican politician, 9th and current Prime Minister of Jamaica
 Balarama Holness (born 1983), Canadian football player and politician
 Bob Holness (1928–2012), English television presenter and actor
 Dean Holness (born 1976), English footballer
 Juliet Holness, Jamaican politician, accountant, real estate agent and writer, wife of Andrew Holness
 Marcus Holness (born 1988), English footballer
 Marian Holness, English earth scientist and academic
 Matthew Holness (born 1975), English comedian, actor, writer and director
 Ned Holness (born 1967), boyhood assumed name of comedian Carlos Mencia
 Nicole Holness (born 1984), Canadian singer and television presenter
 Omar Holness (born 1994), Jamaican footballer
 Winston Holness (born 1951), Jamaican record producer known as "Niney The Observer"

See also
 Holderness (surname)

English-language surnames
English toponymic surnames